Ernst Kaiser (1911–1972) was an Austrian writer and translator.

Ernst Kaiser may also refer to:

Ernst Kaiser (artist) (1803–1865), German landscape painter
Ernst Kaiser (geographer) (1885–1961), German geographer
Ernst Kaiser (mathematician) (1907–1978), Swiss mathematician